Yugorsk Sovetsky (also Pionerskiy, Komsomolskiy-2, or Yugorsk-2) is an air base in Russia located 11 km southwest of Yugorsk. 

The 763rd Fighter Aviation Regiment (763 IAP) was formed here in 1952 and initially used the Yakovlev Yak-9 until 1953 when it was replaced by the Mikoyan-Gurevich MiG-15bis (NATO: Fagot). This was replaced by the Mikoyan-Gurevich MiG-17 (NATO: Fresco) in 1957, being used until 1966. The Yakovlev Yak-25 (NATO: Flashlight) was used between 1955 and 1966 by one squadron. The MiG17 was replaced by the Yakovlev Yak-28P (NATO: Firebar) in 1966 and in turn this was replaced by the Mikoyan MiG-31 (NATO: Foxhound) interceptor in 1983.

The regiment was disbanded in 1998.  A Mikoyan-Gurevich MiG-25 (NATO: Foxbat) is on display in the town of Yugorsk.

Currently the airfield is used for general aviation service to Yugorsk.

See also
:ru:763 истребительный авиационный полк

References

Defunct airports
Russian Air Force bases
Soviet Air Force bases
Soviet Air Defence Force bases
Airports built in the Soviet Union
Airports in Khanty-Mansi Autonomous Okrug